Guardami  is a 1999 Italian drama film written and directed by  Davide Ferrario.

The film premiered at the 56th Venice International Film Festival.  It is loosely based on the life of Moana Pozzi.  Guardami features some explicit sex scenes that caused a slight controversy at the time.

Cast 
Elisabetta Cavallotti: Nina
Stefania Orsola Garello: Cristiana
Flavio Insinna: Flavio
Gianluca Gobbi: Dario
Claudio Spadaro: Baroni
Luigi Diberti: Castellani
Angelica Ippolito: Nina's mother
Yorgo Voyagis: Nina's father
Antonello Grimaldi: Joe
Luca Damiano: himself
Vladimir Luxuria: presenter

Production
It was Elisabetta Cavallotti herself who chose the actor with whom to shoot the unsimulated fellatio scene. "I chose Alex Mantegna because he wasn't too endowed. He was kind, but when I explained why I wanted him, he was offended", she said.

The scene in which Elisabetta Cavallotti performs on stage was not shot in the studio but directly during an erotic event called Mi Sex. The audience and the guys who takes the stage are not extras but normal people who were there for the event. They did not know that a movie was being made and Cavallotti behaved like one of the many performers who went up on stage to perform, between the eyes (and hands) of the audience.

Elisabetta Cavallotti said she thought that if she had a boyfriend, she wouldn't have done the movie, because, "I wouldn't be able to go back to him, after having been naked among the naked bodies of men and women, after having taken strangers' dicks in my mouth, having had who knows how many hands on me."

References

External links

1999 films
1990s Italian-language films
Films about pornography
Films about cancer
1990s erotic drama films
Italian erotic drama films
Films directed by Davide Ferrario
1999 drama films
1990s Italian films